Club Social y Deportivo Carchá, is a Guatemalan football club based in San Pedro Carchá, Alta Verapaz Department. They play their home games in the Estadio Juan Ramon Ponce Guay.

History
The club was founded in 1962 and won promotion to the Liga Mayor B in 1974, entering the competition as Deportivo Carchá Jimmy Álvarez, named after their first manager. In 1992 they joined the Guatemalan second division and they finished champions in the 1997/1998 season to make their debut at the highest level of Guatemalan football, playing in the Liga Nacional de Guatemala in 1998/1999. They were relegated again after the 2000/2001 season and even went down further to the third tier of Guatemalan football.

Most recently they have again been playing in the Primera División Group "A" or "B". They are nicknamed Los Hombres Peces (the Fisherman).

Current squad

List of coaches
 Jimmy Álvarez
 Gildardo Barrientos
 Rodolfo Amílcar Rivera
 Carlos Cloth
 Luis Jacobo Caballeros
 Abraham Chocooj
 Carlos Raúl Juárez
 Juan Carlos Alonzo
 Julián Trujillo
 Ramón Celaya
 Marco Antonio Matheu
 Luis "Ruso" Estrada
 Eduardo Santana
 Julio Gómez
  Carlos de Oliveira (2000–01)
 Arturo Cacao
 Haroldo Cordón
  Ariovaldo Guilherme
  Alex Monterroso (2007–08)

References

External links
 Official website – Deportivo Carchá

Football clubs in Guatemala
Association football clubs established in 1962
1962 establishments in Guatemala